Patrick Pakuliki Mailata (born 31 December 1994) is a Samoan born, New Zealand raised professional boxer. As an amateur, he won three New Zealand national elite championships from 2012 to 2014 and a bronze medal at the 2018 Commonwealth Games.

Early life 
Patrick Pakuliki Mailata was born on 31 December 1994 in Apia, a son of Fuatino Letu'u and Tauleave Lekuala Auapa'au Mailata. Growing up, Mailata was raised in the Samoan villages of Avao and A'ufaga before migrating to New Zealand along with his parents when he was only eight years old. He lived in the South Auckland area, and was educated at Papakura High School, where he was head boy. Mailata excelled in rugby league, but suffered a knee injury that forced him to stop competing. He then discovered boxing and passed up offers from National Rugby League clubs to focus on the sport.

Amateur career 
Mailata participated at the Papatoetoe Boxing Club of Grant Arkell, and fought fellow countryman Joseph Parker twice at the start of his amateur career. At an early age he became a three-time New Zealand amateur heavyweight champion in 2012, 2013, and 2014, as well as winning several amateur tournaments. Mailata competed throughout Auckland and fought at the AIBA Youth World Boxing Championships at Armenia in 2012 but was disqualified for putting his head lower than his Cuban opponent's belt.

At 18-years-of-age Mailata competed in Guiyang at the China Open boxing event. He was awarded a bronze medal after losing to local Chinese fighter Yusufu Akepaer in the semi-final. After winning national tournaments, Mailata received financial backing from a promotional company, Duco Events. It saw him contest in international competitions such as the Gee Bee Tournament in Finland and the 52nd Winner Tournament in Serbia where he respectively won a bronze and gold medal. He also became a participant at the 2014 Glasgow Commonwealth Games. The following year, Mailata suffered a loss to Australian Joe Goodall in the Oceanian Championships super-heavyweight gold medal final. His second placed finish saw him as one of four New Zealanders that qualified for the AIBA World Boxing Championships in Qatar. He lost his first round matchup against Rafael Lima of Brazil.

In 2016 Mailata missed out on qualifying for the 2016 Rio Summer Olympics after losing to Kazakhstan's Ivan Dychko at the Asia and Oceania Qualification Tournament. He then fell short in a repeat loss to Joe Goodwall at the 2017 Oceanian Championships, winning a second silver medal. Mailata had his first chance to compete at a semi-professional level after being drafted by the World Series of Boxing franchise, British Lionhearts. In the first leg, he narrowly lost to France Fighting Roosters competitor, Jonathan Nacto at the Salle Wagram. Mailata ended his second leg match with a third round stoppage over Nursultan Amanzhilov of the Astana Arlans. He had his second successive win after an abandoned decision in round four against Marijan Brnic.

Professional career

Early career 
In late October 2018 it was revealed Mailata would turn professional after being announced as a feature on Shane Cameron's Counterpunch Fight Night in November at ABA Stadium. Mailata was scheduled to fight fellow New Zealander Thomas Russell but was later replaced by Jayson Aloese. He recorded a dominant first-round technical knockout. After signing a promotional agreement with Epic Sports and Entertainment in June 2019, it was announced he would make his United States debut in Las Vegas. Mailata remained unbeaten after winning a second consecutive first-round knockout victory over Daniel Felix Franco in his first fight overseas. The following month Mailata fought on the opening undercard bout of Cody Crowley versus Mian Hussain on UFC Fight Pass in Peterborough, Canada. He then fought during December in Bulgaria against Ukrainian Pavlo Krolenko.

Professional boxing record

References

External links 
 
 
 

1994 births
Living people
Super-heavyweight boxers
Boxers at the 2014 Commonwealth Games
New Zealand male boxers
People from Apia
Boxers at the 2018 Commonwealth Games
Commonwealth Games medallists in boxing
Commonwealth Games bronze medallists for New Zealand
Samoan emigrants to New Zealand
People educated at Papakura High School
Medallists at the 2018 Commonwealth Games